"Pyromania" is a song performed by German Eurodance group Cascada, released as the first single from their fourth studio album, Original Me. It was written by Yann Peifer, Allan Eshuijs, and Manuel Reuter, and it was produced by Reuter and Peifer. The song was premiered on February 12, 2010, and was first released on March 19, 2010 by Zooland Records. "Pyromania" features Natalie Horler singing the whole song with guest male vocals speaking the "pyro-pyro" hook. Lyrically, the song is a play on words. It talks about a love and obsession with fire.

"Pyromania" received mixed reviews from contemporary critics. Some praised its infectious nature and catchy hook, while others felt the song was unoriginal. "Pyromania" garnered moderate chart success for Cascada; reaching the top forty in Austria, Czech Republic, France, Germany, The Netherlands and Scotland. The music video premiered on February 17, 2010 on British television station Clubland TV. It features Natalie Horler in different scenes in which she is by herself and with backup dancers, singing and dancing in front of futuristic space balls and fire explosions. Cascada performed "Pyromania" live on German television program The Dome and at The 2010 Pepsi B96 Summerbash.

Music video
The music video premiered on the evening of February 17, 2010 on Clubland's YouTube. It shows Natalie in different scenes in which she is by herself and with backup dancers. One scene shows her singing in front of futuristic space balls, and another scene shows her dancing while an explosion takes up one half of the screen. The clip was filmed in Toronto, Canada.

Formats and listings
These are the formats and track listings of major single releases of "Pyromania":

German CD Single
"Pyromania" (Radio Edit)  – 3:31
"Pyromania" (Spencer & Hill Airplay Mix)  – 5:40

German Digital EP
"Pyromania" (Radio Edit)  – 3:31
"Pyromania" (Spencer & Hill Airplay Mix)  – 5:40
"Pyromania" (Extended Mix)  – 5:31
"Pyromania" (Cahill Remix)  – 6:17
"Pyromania" (Dan Winter Remix)  – 5:32

UK Digital Single
"Pyromania" (Radio Edit)  – 3:31
"Pyromania" (Cahill Remix)  – 6:17

U.S. Digital EP 
"Pyromania" (Radio Edit)  – 3:31
"Pyromania" (Wideboys Radio Edit)  – 3:06
"Pyromania" (Cahill Radio Edit)  – 3:26
"Pyromania" (Spencer & Hill Radio Edit)  – 3:39
"Pyromania" (Dan Winter Radio Edit)  – 3:44
"Pyromania" (Frisco Radio Edit)  – 3:13
"Pyromania" (Extended Mix)  – 5:31
"Pyromania" (Wideboys Remix)  – 7:34
"Pyromania" (Cahill Remix)  – 6:17
"Pyromania" (Spencer & Hill Airplay Mix)  – 5:40
"Pyromania" (Dan Winter Remix)  – 5:32
"Pyromania" (Frisco Remix)  – 5:28

U.S. Digital EP (Re-Release)
"Pyromania" (Video Edit) - 3:29
"Pyromania" (Spencer & Hill Airplay Radio Edit) - 3:37
"Pyromania" (Dan Winter Radio Edit) - 3:42
"Pyromania" (Wideboys Radio Edit) - 3:04
"Pyromania" (Cahill Radio Edit) - 3:24
"Pyromania" (Frisco Radio Edit) - 3:11
"Pyromania" (Extended Mix) - 5:29
"Pyromania" (Spencer & Hill Remix) - 5:38
"Pyromania" (Dan Winter Remix) - 5:30
"Pyromania" (Wideboys Remix) - 7:32
"Pyromania" (Cahill Remix) - 6:14
"Pyromania" (Frisco Remix) - 5:28

Australian Digital EP
"Pyromania" (Radio Edit)  – 3:31
"Pyromania" (Spencer & Hill Airplay Mix)  – 5:40
"Pyromania" (Extended Mix)  – 5:31
"Pyromania" (Cahill Remix)  – 6:17
"Pyromania" (Dan Winter Remix)  – 5:32
"Pyromania" (Wideboys Remix)  – 7:34
"Pyromania" (Music Video)  – 3:39

Release History

Charts

Weekly charts

Year-end charts

References

External links
 

Cascada songs
2010 singles
Songs written by Allan Eshuijs
Songs written by DJ Manian
Songs written by Yanou
2009 songs